Mark Alfred Longietti (born January 16, 1964) is an American politician and lawyer. A Democrat, he is a former member of the Pennsylvania House of Representatives, representing the 7th District from 2007 to 2022.

Early life and education
He was born in Sharon, Pennsylvania and grew up in Sharpsville, Pennsylvania. He graduated from Sharpsville Area High School in 1981. He graduated from Westminster College with a Bachelor of Arts degree in economics and political science in 1985 and from Boston College Law School with a Juris Doctor in 1988.

Legal career
After graduation in 1988, he served as a law clerk for a year and was a partner with Routman, Moore, Goldstone and Valentino until 2000. In 2001, he operated an independent practice and served as solicitor for Mercer County, Pennsylvania. Since 2007 he has served as Of Counsel for Ekker, Kuster, McCall & Epstein, LLP.

Political career
He has served as a member of the Pennsylvania Democratic State Committee since 1993. He was a  delegate to the 2000 Democratic National Convention and an alternate delegate to the 1996 Democratic National Convention.

Committee assignments 

 Education, Dem Chair

Personal life
Longietti and his wife Tina live in Hermitage.

References

External links
Pennsylvania House of Representatives - Mark Longietti  official PA House website
Pennsylvania House Democratic Caucus - Rep. Mark A. Longietti official Party website

Follow the Money - Mark Longietti
2006 campaign contributions

1964 births
Living people
Westminster College (Pennsylvania) alumni
Boston College Law School alumni
Democratic Party members of the Pennsylvania House of Representatives
People from Hermitage, Pennsylvania
21st-century American politicians
20th-century American lawyers
21st-century American lawyers
20th-century American politicians